Black Paradise is a 1926 American silent adventure film directed by Roy William Neill and starring Madge Bellamy, Leslie Fenton, and Edmund Lowe.

Cast

References

Bibliography
 Solomon, Aubrey. The Fox Film Corporation, 1915-1935: A History and Filmography. McFarland, 2011.

External links

1926 films
1926 adventure films
American adventure films
American silent feature films
Fox Film films
Films directed by Roy William Neill
Films set in San Francisco
American black-and-white films
1920s English-language films
1920s American films
Silent adventure films